Billy Boat Motorsports was an American professional stock car racing team that last competed in the NASCAR Xfinity Series, and the Camping World Truck Series. The team was owned by former IndyCar Series driver Billy Boat. Founded in 2014 and based in Mooresville, North Carolina, the team fielded the No. 84 CorvetteParts.net Chevrolet Camaro for Chad Boat part-time in the NASCAR Xfinity Series, and the No. 15 811 Call Before You Dig Chevrolet Silverado for Mason Mingus full-time in the NASCAR Camping World Truck Series.

History
The team began racing in the K&N Pro Series East and West in 2010 with Billy Boat's son Chad Boat, expanding to the ARCA Racing Series for 2012 and 2013. The team expanded into the national series of NASCAR in 2014.

The team receives engines from ECR Engines.

Xfinity Series

Car No. 84 history
On January 7, 2014, team announced that driver Chad Boat, son of owner Billy Boat, would compete with the No. 84 Chevrolet Camaro in the 2014 NASCAR Nationwide Series season, attempting 15 races in its debut season with sponsorship from Keen Parts/CorvetteParts.net. Boat qualified for 13 of his 15 attempts, running the No. 17 for Vision Racing at Talladega after failing to qualify. Boat had a best finish of 24th at Daytona in February.

Boat returned part-time in 2015, with sponsor Keen Parts renewing their partnership.

Car No. 84 results

Camping World Truck Series

Truck No. 15 history
The team announced on September 18, 2014 that it would field a No. 15 Chevrolet Silverado in the final six races of the 2014 NASCAR Camping World Truck Series schedule with rookie driver Mason Mingus, beginning with the Rhino Linings 350 at Las Vegas Motor Speedway. Mingus had run the previous 16 races in Win-Tron Racing's No. 35 Toyota Tundra with sponsor 811 Call Before You Dig. Mingus would finish 11th in points, with three top 15 finishes under BBM.

Mingus and 811 returned to the team in 2015. Mingus failed to qualify at Daytona, but earned his first top 10 finish with the team at Kansas. Chad Boat replaced Mingus for one race at Eldora to make his Camping World Truck Series debut, finishing 31st.

The team's owner points were sold to Tommy Joe Martins and Martins Motorsports in 2016.

Truck No. 16 history
In 2015, BBM ran a second truck numbered 16 part-time with Chad Boat. They attempted four late season races beginning at Chicagoland in September. They made three races, with qualifying cancelled at Chicago, and Boat had a best finish of 9th at Talladega.

References

Defunct NASCAR teams
ARCA Menards Series teams
Auto racing teams established in 2014
2014 establishments in North Carolina